Maggie Szabo is a Canadian soul and pop singer and songwriter. She was the featured vocalist on an album by German electronic DJ Schiller.

Early life and education

Szabo was born in Hamilton, Ontario and grew up in Dundas, Ontario. After high school, she moved to Nashville, Tennessee to pursue her music career. She had her first exposure performing cover versions on YouTube, including a collaboration with Walk Off The Earth for their cover of "Party Rock Anthem", which was viewed over 9 million times. After releasing her debut album, Szabo's music videos for her original songs began going viral on YouTube.

Career

In November 2012, Szabo released her debut pop album Now Hear Me Out. All original songs on her album were co-written by Szabo with production by Justin Gray, Gavin Bradley, and Tanya Leah.

After her first album, Maggie moved to Los Angeles, where she performed at the Viper Room, House of Blues, and the Hotel Café. Szabo's music was premiered by Yahoo!, licensed in Criminal Minds and Keeping Up with the Kardashians, and shared by Jay Z's platform Tidal.

Szabo's track "Tidal Waves and Hurricanes" was premiered exclusively by Ryan Seacrest in 2014.

Discography

Studio albums

As featured artist

Awards and nominations
In 2014, Szabo was nominated "Best Pop" for the Toronto Independent Music Awards. She was also voted as the Top 5 most voted for US artists by the BalconyTV.

References

External links
 

Living people
Canadian pop singers
Canadian soul singers
Musicians from Hamilton, Ontario
Year of birth missing (living people)